The Ministry of the Environment and Energy is a government department of Greece responsible for environmental and energy policy. It was created on 7 October 2009 as the Ministry of the Environment, Energy and Climate Change to succeed the Ministry for the Environment, Physical Planning and Public Works. The incumbent minister is Kostas Skrekas of New Democracy.

List of Ministers for the Environment, Energy and Climate Change (2009–2015)

List of Ministers for Productive Reconstruction, the Environment and Energy (2015)

List of Ministers of the Environment and Energy (since September 2015)

External links
 Ministry website

Government of Greece
Lists of government ministers of Greece
Greece
Greece
Government ministries of Greece